"Tararan/Puffy no Tourmen" is the seventh single released by Japanese pop duo Puffy AmiYumi. It was released on August 29, 1998. The music video has Ami and Yumi singing, interspersed with scenes of a traveling polar bear.

Track listing
Tararan 
Puffy no Tourmen 
Tararan (Original Karaoke)
Puffy no Tourmen (Original Karaoke)

References

Puffy AmiYumi songs
1998 singles